The 1829 Torrevieja earthquake occurred near the city of Torrevieja, Province of Alicante of southern Spain on March 21, 1829. It had an estimated magnitude of 6.6  and a Mercalli intensity of IX (Violent). It severely damaged many cities. The event was named after the city of Torrevieja because it was the largest locality to be affected.

Earthquake
In the southern province of Alicante, the period between 1820 and 1830 was the most seismically active, affecting the Bajo Segura seismotectonic line which has three major faults: the Benejúzar-Benijófar, Guardamar del Segura and Torrevieja faults.

From September 13, 1828 to March 21, 1829, there were a series of earthquakes in the area estimated at more than two hundred. At 18:10 on March 21, 1829 an earthquake occurred, measuring 6.6  and assigned a maximum intensity of IX (Violent).

Damage and casualties
At least 2,965 house were totally destroyed and 2,396 were damaged. Destruction of bridges over the Segura river in Almoradi, Benejúzar, Dolores and Guardamar was reported. Hundred of people were killed, half of them in Almoradí.

See also
 List of earthquakes in Spain
 1884 Andalusian earthquake

References
 El nuevo urbanismo del Bajo Segura a consecuencia del terremoto de 1829, Gregorio Canales Martínez, Biblioteca Virtual Miguel de Cervantes. (in Spanish) 
 Terremotos más importantes ocurridos en España, Instituto Geográfico Nacional de España|Instituto Geográfico Nacional, Ministerio de Fomento. (in Spanish) 
 Memoria (...) de los terremotos de 21 de marzo..., José Agustín de Larramendi, 1829, Biblioteca Digital Hispánica. (in Spanish)

1829 in Spain
1829 earthquakes
March 1829 events
Earthquakes in Spain
Province of Alicante